The Winner is a 1926 American silent action film directed by Harry Joe Brown and starring Billy Sullivan, Lucille Hutton and Ben Walker.

Cast
 Billy Sullivan as Scotty MacTavish
 Lucille Hutton as Patsy Thorne
 Ben Walker as Ben Reader
 Martin Turner as Scotty's Second
 Tom O'Brien as Slugger Martin
 George B. Williams as Archer Thorne

References

Bibliography
 Munden, Kenneth White. The American Film Institute Catalog of Motion Pictures Produced in the United States, Part 1. University of California Press, 1997.

External links
 

1926 films
1926 drama films
1920s English-language films
American silent feature films
Silent American drama films
American black-and-white films
Films directed by Harry Joe Brown
Rayart Pictures films
1920s American films